Carsten Jørgensen (born 25 October 1970) is a Danish orienteering competitor and World champion. He won a gold medal in the 1997 World Orienteering Championships in Grimstad with the Danish Relay team. He received a bronze medal in the 1995 World Orienteering Championships in Detmold (classic distance).

He has been quite successful in cross country running competitions. He finished fourth at the 1996 European Cross Country Championships and went on to take the gold medal at the 1997 edition. He won the senior race at the Nordic Cross Country Championships consecutively in 1997 and 1998. He competed in the European Championships for a third time in 1998, finishing in fifth place. He was the 1999 winner of the men's race at the Eurocross in Luxembourg.

National merits
Jørgensen is 17 times Danish Orienteering Champion (various disciplines/distances). He has represented Denmark 59 times, on the Danish National Team. He set the Danish record in the 10,000 metres in 1998, and Danish record in the half marathon, also in 1998.

See also
 Danish orienteers
 List of orienteers
 List of orienteering events

References

External links

Living people
1970 births
Danish male long-distance runners
Danish orienteers
Male orienteers
Foot orienteers
World Orienteering Championships medalists
European Cross Country Championships winners
Competitors at the 2001 World Games